Susanne Zeller ( Hirzel; 7 November 1921 – 4 December 2012) was a German member of the resistance group the White Rose.

Life
Susanne Hirzel, daughter of Ulm pastor Ernst Hirzel and granddaughter of the geographer Robert Gradmann, was initially an enthusiastic member of the League of German Girls (where Sophie Scholl was her group leader), but distanced herself increasingly from those in power.

Hirzel became a student at the State Academy for Music in Stuttgart, where by spring 1942 her exceptional musical ability was being recognised.

Hirzel and White Rose
In late 1942, while a music student, she again met Sophie Scholl, who called for resistance. At the end of January, at the request of her teenage brother Hans she distributed envelopes containing the fifth "White Rose" leaflet in mailboxes in Stuttgart. This secret operation was prepared together with Hans' classmate Franz Josef Müller in Ulm Martin Luther Church behind the organ. Her father Ernst Hirzel was then pastor at this parish.

After the arrest and execution of the Scholls, Susanne, her brother Hans, and Franz Josef Müller, were also arrested and convicted in the second "White Rose" trial (in which Kurt Huber, Willi Graf and Alexander Schmorell were sentenced by the People's Court under Roland Freisler to death). Hirzel was sentenced to six months' imprisonment because her knowledge of the leaflets could not be established.

After the war
After the collapse of the Nazi dictatorship in 1945, she became a cello teacher. She wrote a number of books on cello technique.

Like her brother Hans, a functionary of the Republican party and their Presidential candidate, Susanne Hirzel was active in right-wing circles, particularly among the Republicans. In her memoirs A Swabian Youth she writes, inter alia, to the effect that 'The Allies had been "trying to eradicate as many Germans" in their air raids on German cities, and the German concentration camps were of the "model" that Stalin used and that the British followed in the Boer War'. Furthermore she gave interviews to Junge Freiheit in 2002 and to the anti-Islamic blog Politically Incorrect in 2010. She lived most recently in Stuttgart and became actively involved in the counter-jihad Citizens' Movement Pax Europa (BPE) against the "Islamisation" of Germany, seeing parallels between the subversion of democracy by the Nazis and the aims of the Jihad.

After retiring she published her memories of life in Nazi Germany, in her book, From Yes to No. A Swabian Youth 1933–1945 (2000).

The  in the foyer of the EinsteinHaus, the headquarters of the Ulmer Volkshochschule (Adult Education Centre of Ulm) includes a portrait of Susanne Hirzel.

References 

1921 births
2012 deaths
German Christian pacifists
Lutheran pacifists
German Lutherans
German revolutionaries
Ludwig Maximilian University of Munich
Nonviolence advocates
People from Hohenlohe (district)
Protestants in the German Resistance
White Rose members
Women in World War II
20th-century Lutherans
Female anti-fascists
Counter-jihad activists
People convicted of treason against Germany